The Ogden Museum of Southern Art is located in the Warehouse Arts District of downtown New Orleans, Louisiana. 

Established in 1999, and in Stephen Goldring Hall at 925 Camp Street since 2003.

The building 
The Ogden consists of two main buildings: the Patrick F. Taylor Library built in 1889 and designed by architect Henry Hobson Richardson, and the adjacent Stephen Goldring Hall (named after Stephen Goldring), a 47,000-square-foot, five-story glass and stone building built in 2003. The museum also includes the Museum Store and the Center for Southern Craft and Design.

The museum's location is across the street from the National World War II Museum and the New Orleans Contemporary Arts Center. The three institutions anchor an arts district serving local residents and over 11 million visitors to New Orleans. The museum is a Smithsonian Affiliate.

Collection

The collection consists of work by artists from or associated with fifteen southern states (Alabama, Arkansas, Florida, Georgia, Kentucky, Louisiana, Maryland, Mississippi, North Carolina, Oklahoma, South Carolina, Tennessee, Texas, Virginia, and West Virginia) and the District of Columbia. It is based upon the founding donation of more than 600 works from New Orleans businessman Roger H. Ogden's private collection. Since this original donation the museum's collection of paintings, watercolors, drawings, prints, photographs, sculpture, wood and crafts has grown to include more than 4,000 works donated from individuals and collectors from across the US.

Among the many artists represented in the museum's collection are John Alexander, Walter Anderson, Benny Andrews, Clementine Hunter, George Rodrigue, George Dureau, William Dunlap, Ida Kohlmeyer, Will Henry Stevens, Kendall Shaw, Hunt Slonem, James Michalopoulos and George Ohr.

When the Ogden Museum opened in 2003, the New York Times observed that there is no easily identifiable Southern art style in the museum's collection. A sense of place, history and memory were themes that emerged. According to the Times, the artwork in the collection “range from folk art to shadowy paintings of bayous and back streets, from haunting old photographs to bright modern abstractions.” The museum has permanent galleries and changing exhibitions throughout the year.

Awards and recognition 
The Ogden's Teen Docent Program was created in 2008 and had seen over 40 students enrolled at the time of the award. The students interacted with more than 7,000 people through museum tours, outreach programs and summer camps.

Ogden was recognized for his years of service with many non-profit organizations as well as his devotion to Southern art and his initial gift to the Ogden Museum of about 600 paintings and sculpture.

The Ogden Museum was selected to receive a grant from Bloomberg Philanthropies as part of its Arts Innovation and Management Program. The program will provide operating support and management training through a $43 million multi-year program for institutions across the country. The announcement was made in 2018.

References

External links

 Ogden Museum of Southern Art
 The Ogden Museum of Southern Art: The Resilience of Culture in the American South

Museums in New Orleans
Museums of American art
University museums in Louisiana
Art museums and galleries in Louisiana
Art museums established in 2003
2003 establishments in Louisiana
University of New Orleans
Southern art